The High Sheriff of Roscommon was the British Crown's judicial representative in County Roscommon, Ireland from 1575 until 1922, when the office was abolished in the new Free State and replaced by the office of Roscommon County Sheriff. The sheriff had judicial, electoral, ceremonial and administrative functions and executed High Court Writs. In 1908, an Order in Council made the Lord-Lieutenant the Sovereign's prime representative in a county and reduced the High Sheriff's precedence. However the sheriff retained his responsibilities for the preservation of law and order in the county. The usual procedure for appointing the sheriff from 1660 onwards was that three persons were nominated at the beginning of each year from the county and the Lord Lieutenant then appointed his choice as High Sheriff for the remainder of the year. Often the other nominees were appointed as under-sheriffs. Sometimes a sheriff did not fulfil his entire term through death or other event and another sheriff was then appointed for the remainder of the year. The dates given hereunder are the dates of appointment.  All addresses are in County Roscommon unless stated otherwise.

High Sheriffs of County Roscommon

1621: William O'Mulloy of Ughterthiera
1641: William O'Mulloy of Ughterthiera
1650: George Lane of Tulsk 
1657: James King of Charlestown
1659: Owen Wynne
1664: Edmund Donelan of Cloghan
1665:
1679: Edmund Donelan of Cloghan
1680:
1683: Robert Sandys
1685: Robert Sandys
1692: Walter Pollard of Castlepollard
1693: Theobald Mulloy

18th century

19th century

20th century

References

 
Roscommon
History of County Roscommon